The 2001 UAB Blazers football team represented the University of Alabama at Birmingham (UAB) in the college football season of 2001, and was the eleventh team fielded by the school. The Blazers' head coach was Watson Brown, who entered his seventh season as UAB's head coach. They played their home games at Legion Field in Birmingham, Alabama, and competed as a member of Conference USA. The Blazers finished their sixth season at the I-A level, and their third affiliated with a conference with a record of 6–5 (5–2 C-USA).

Schedule

Roster

References

UAB
UAB Blazers football seasons
UAB Blazers football